Wilhelm August Rudolf Lehmann (19 August 1819, near Hamburg – 27 October 1905, in Bushey) was a German-English portraitist and author. He moved to the United Kingdom in 1866.

Life

Lehmann was born in Ottensen (now part of Hamburg) in the Duchy of Holstein, the son of painter Leo Lehmann.  
He and his elder brother Henri Lehmann studied in Paris at the École des Beaux-arts, in Rome, and with the painters Peter von Cornelius and Wilhelm von Kaulbach.  
Lehmann's major painting, The Blessing of the Pontine Marshes by Sixtus V was shown in Paris in 1846 and bought by the French government.

In 1866 Lehmann settled in London, became a British citizen, and painted his best-known portraits.

He married Amelia Chambers, daughter of the Scot author and naturalist Robert Chambers.  
Amelia's sister Nina married Lehmann's younger brother Frederick, and the extended social circle of the two couples included Charles Dickens, George Eliot, Robert Browning, Lord Leighton, and other prominent figures. 
 
In 1896, a number of his engraved portraits were collected and published as Men and Women of the Century. Lehmann's memoir was published in 1894 as An Artist's Reminiscences.

He died at his home, Boumemede, Bushey, on 27 October 1905 and was buried in the east side of Highgate Cemetery. His daughter, Liza was later buried with him.

Family
One of Lehmann's daughters was Liza Lehmann, who became a notable English soprano and composer.  Lehmann was the uncle of the British journalist and politician Rudolf Chambers Lehmann.

Gallery

References

External links 
 Portraits by Rudolf Lehmann at the National Portrait Gallery, London.
 Drawings by Lehmann in the British Museum.

1819 births
1905 deaths
Burials at Highgate Cemetery
People from Altona, Hamburg
People from the Duchy of Holstein
British alumni of the École des Beaux-Arts
English people of German descent
Naturalised citizens of the United Kingdom
Lehmann family
19th-century English painters
English male painters
20th-century English painters
19th-century German painters
19th-century male artists
German male painters
20th-century German painters
20th-century male artists